Rocky Arbor State Park is a  Wisconsin state park in the Wisconsin Dells region.  The park was established in 1932 to protect sandstone outcrops eroded into picturesque walls and ledges.

Natural history
The region is formed from Late Cambrian sandstone deposited 500 million years ago at the bottom of shallow inland seas.  Much later the Wisconsin River flowed over this tract of land, carving channels into the sandstone.  The river has since changed course, now running  to the east, leaving the rock walls of its former gorge exposed.  A small creek now flows through the park, though in the opposite direction as the river once did..

Recreation
Situated in a major tourist area, Rocky Arbor State Park has well-developed visitor amenities despite its small size.  There is a campground with 89 campsites (18 of them with electrical hookups), showers, flush toilets, a playground, dump station, and picnic area.  A single loop trail provides views of the rock ledges, with a spur trail to the campground.  The park is open to vehicle traffic only in the summer.  During the off-season visitors can park at the gate and enter the grounds on foot.

Climate

References
Wisconsin Department of Natural Resources. Rocky Arbor State Park signage, brochures, and website.

External links

WDNR park website
Park map

Protected areas of Juneau County, Wisconsin
Rock formations of Wisconsin
Protected areas of Sauk County, Wisconsin
State parks of Wisconsin
Protected areas established in 1932
Landforms of Juneau County, Wisconsin
Landforms of Sauk County, Wisconsin
1932 establishments in Wisconsin